The 2017 UMass Dartmouth Corsairs football team represented the University of Massachusetts Dartmouth as a member of the Massachusetts State Collegiate Athletic Conference (MASCAC) during the 2017 NCAA Division III football season. The Corsairs, led by 11th-year head coach Mark Robichaud, played their home games at Cressy Field in Dartmouth, Massachusetts.

Previous season

The Corsairs finished the 2016 season with a record of 5–5 (4–4 in the MASCAC). They finished tied for fourth place.

The team finished the 2016 season unranked.

Schedule

Game summaries

Mount Ida

Westfield State

Personnel

Coaching staff

Roster

Statistics

Team

Individual leaders

Offense

Special teams

References

UMass Dartmouth
UMass Dartmouth Corsairs football seasons
UMass Dartmouth Corsairs football